This is a list of events in British radio during 1973.

Events

January
 Test transmissions for the London music and entertainment ILR licence using the VHF frequency 95.8 MHz for FM from the Croydon transmitter and the MW frequency 557 kHz (539 m) for AM from London Transport's Lots Road Power Station, Chelsea, begin. The location of the medium-wave transmitter and the frequency used are only temporary until a new high-powered medium-wave station at Saffron Green, Barnet, is completed. These tests commence a month prior to the IBA awarding the licence to Capital Radio.

February
 4 February – David Rudkin's original radio play Cries from Casement as His Bones are Brought to Dublin is broadcast by the BBC, produced by John Tydeman with Norman Rodway in the title role.

March
 No events.

April
 8 April – Kenny Everett briefly returns to BBC Radio 1 before moving to Capital Radio later in the year.
 9 April – The first edition of daily arts (and, originally, science) review programme Kaleidoscope is broadcast on BBC Radio 4.

May
 No events.

June
 1 June – Tony Blackburn presents his final Breakfast Show for Radio 1, having fronted the show since the station went on air in 1967.
 4 June – 
 Noel Edmonds succeeds Tony Blackburn as host of the Radio 1 Breakfast Show.
 Tony Blackburn moves to the mid-morning slot and one of the new features of his show is an hour of records that charted in the same year. The feature is called The Golden Hour.
 29 June – Programmes For Schools are broadcast on all Radio 4 frequencies for the final time. From next term they are aired only on VHF.

July
 2 July – Woman's Hour is transferred from BBC Radio 2 to BBC Radio 4.
 23 July – The very first Radio 1 Roadshow takes place. It comes from Newquay, Cornwall and is hosted by Alan Freeman.

August
 No events.

September
 10 September – Newsbeat bulletins air on BBC Radio 1 for the first time.

October
 8 October – 
 LBC becomes the first legal Independent Local Radio station in the United Kingdom when it begins broadcasting at just before 6am, providing talk radio to the London area.
 At 6am, the very first Independent Radio News bulletin is broadcast.
 16 October – Capital Radio begins broadcasting a music-based general entertainment service to the London area.

November
 No events.

December
 23 December – I'm Sorry, I'll Read That Again airs its last episode.
 31 December – 
 Radio Clyde, the first independent local radio station outside London, and the first in Scotland, begins broadcasting to the Glasgow area.
 The first edition of Good Morning Scotland is broadcast. It replaces Today in Scotland which had been aired as an opt-out of BBC Radio 4’s Today programme.

Station debuts
 8 October – LBC
 16 October – Capital Radio
 24 November – BBC Radio Carlisle
 31 December – Radio Clyde

Changes of station frequency

Programme debuts
 11 January – Byron's Don Juan read by Ronald Pickup on BBC Radio 3 (1973)
 9 April – Kaleidoscope on BBC Radio 4 (1973–1998)
 6 May – The Foundation Trilogy on BBC Radio 4 (1973)
 10 September – Newsbeat on BBC Radio 1 (1973–Present)
 31 December – Good Morning Scotland on BBC Radio Scotland (1973–Present)
 Unknown – Hello Cheeky on BBC Radio 2 (1973–1979)

Continuing radio programmes

1940s
 Sunday Half Hour (1940–2018)
 Desert Island Discs (1942–Present)
 Down Your Way (1946–1992)
 Letter from America (1946–2004)
 Woman's Hour (1946–Present)
 A Book at Bedtime (1949–Present)

1950s
 The Archers (1950–Present)
 The Today Programme (1957–Present)
 The Navy Lark (1959–1977)
 Sing Something Simple (1959–2001)
 Your Hundred Best Tunes (1959–2007)

1960s
 Farming Today (1960–Present)
 In Touch (1961–Present)
 The Men from the Ministry (1962–1977)
 Petticoat Line (1965–1979)
 The World at One (1965–Present)
 The Official Chart (1967–Present)
 Just a Minute (1967–Present)
 The Living World (1968–Present)
 The Organist Entertains (1969–2018)

1970s
 PM (1970–Present)
 Start the Week (1970–Present)
 Week Ending (1970–1998)
 You and Yours (1970–Present)
 I'm Sorry I Haven't a Clue (1972–Present)

Ending this year
23 December – I'm Sorry, I'll Read That Again (1964–1973)

Births
 27 January – Lucy Porter, comedian
 12 March – Mishal Husain, broadcast news presenter
 24 April – Gabby Logan, radio and television presenter
 8 May – Marcus Brigstocke, comedian
 14 May – Clare Teal, jazz singer and radio presenter
 24 May – Matthew Rudd, radio presenter
 20 August – Stephen Nolan, Northern Ireland broadcaster
 September – Tim Harford, economist
 3 October – Grace Dent, broadcaster, restaurant critic and YA author
 11 October – Mark Chapman, broadcaster and newsreader

Deaths
 6 June – Jimmy Clitheroe, comic entertainer (born 1921)
 27 October – Howard Marshall, radio commentator (born 1900)

See also
 1973 in British music
 1973 in British television
 1973 in the United Kingdom
 List of British films of 1973

References

Radio
British Radio, 1973 In
Years in British radio